Chhapra can refer to the following:
 Chapra (Buddha), a fictional character in the manga series Buddha.

Places 
 Chapra (Lok Sabha constituency), a former Lok Sabha constituency in Bihar, India
 Chapra, Nadia (community development block), in Nadia district, West Bengal, India
 Chapra, Nadia, census town in Chapra, Nadia (community development block), in Nadia district, West Bengal, India
 Chapra, Nadia (Vidhan Sabha constituency), in Nadia district, West Bengal, India
 Chapra, Saran (Vidhan Sabha constituency), in Saran district, Bihar, India
 Chhapra, headquarters of Saran district, Bihar, India